Sasin may refer to:

People 
 Dmitri Sasin (born 1996), Russian footballer
 Jacek Sasin (born 1969), Polish politician 
 Pavel Sasín (born 1950), Czechoslovak triple jumper
 Paweł Sasin (born 1983), Polish footballer

Other uses
 Selasphorus sasin, species of hummingbird
 Sasin Spraymaster, agricultural aircraft
 Sasin Graduate Institute of Business Administration of Chulalongkorn University
 SS-8 Sasin, two-stage IRBM of the Soviet Union

Polish-language surnames